Il ritorno di Don Calandrino (The Return of Don Calandrino), also known as Armidoro e Laurina, is an intermezzo in two acts by Domenico Cimarosa to an Italian libretto presumably written by Giuseppe Petrosellini.

Performance history
The premiere took place in 1778 at Teatro Valle in Rome. Performances in Livorno (1783), Prague (1785), Vienna (1787), Barcelona (1788), Florence (1788 and 1793) and Padua (1801) followed. After a long break, the opera was revived in 2007 under the musical direction of Riccardo Muti in a series of performances at the Salzburg Festival,  in Las Palmas, Teatro Municipale in Piacenza,  in Pisa, and the Ravenna Festival.

Roles

Synopsis
The libretto gives a humorous account of characters and actions of Don Calandrino, the son of the podestà of Monte Secco (Abruzzo, Italy), who pretends he knows everything, but in fact is incapable of even thinking logically; Livietta, a haughty and rich peasant girl, who tries to act as a lady, but invariably fails both in her language and manners; Monsieur Le Blonde, a French traveler eager to talk about places he has supposedly visited, but of which he knows nothing; Irene, a simple and humble girl; and Valerio, the Mayor of Monte Secco and Irene’s brother. After several turns, the story resolves in pairing Don Calandrino with Livietta, and Le Blonde with Irene.

Recordings

References
Notes

Cited sources
 Giustiniani, Lorenzo (1803), Dizionario geografico-ragionato del Regno di Napoli, Tomo VI
 Rossi, Nick, and Fauntleroy, Talmage (1999), Domenico Cimarosa: His Life and His Operas, Greenwood Press.

External links
 Libretto in Italian at the Google Books
 Libretto in Italian and German at the Saxon State and University Library Dresden
 Manuscript score at the International Music Score Library Project
 Manuscript score at the Bibliothèque nationale de France
 Score of Monsieur Le Blonde's aria at the 

Italian-language operas
Opera buffa
1778 operas
Operas